Wild West Comedy Show: 30 Days and 30 Nights – Hollywood to the Heartland is a comedy documentary film directed by Ari Sandel and follows the 30-day comedy tour of several stand up comedians. It premiered September 8, 2006, at the Toronto International Film Festival. It opened in wide release in the United States on February 8, 2008.

Synopsis
The documentary follows the month-long live comedy variety tour of Vince Vaughn and four stand-up comedians in the spirit of Wild West shows. Vaughn picked four comedians from The Comedy Store in Los Angeles (Ahmed Ahmed, John Caparulo, Bret Ernst and Sebastian Maniscalco) for the tour. The tour began September 12, 2005 in Hollywood at the Music Box Theater and spanned 30 shows over 30 consecutive nights in 30 cities across the United States. Vince Vaughn acts as emcee and performs improv sketches with surprise guests. The comedians traveled over 6,000 miles on their tour and included stops in the Western, Southern, and Midwestern states. The film highlights their performances on-stage and contains interviews with the various comedians.

Cast
Ahmed Ahmed
Peter Billingsley
John Caparulo
Jon Favreau
Justin Long
Sebastian Maniscalco
Keir O'Donnell
Vince Vaughn

Production
Vince Vaughn produced the film, along with his friend Peter Billingsley. The two had met in 1990 while making an episode of CBS Schoolbreak Special. Vaughn's older sister Victoria was also a producer. Chris Henkel, Paul Ruffolo, Dave Rutherford, and Jani Zandovskis served as camera operators. The show director was Chad Horning. The stage manager was Jason Ruffolo. The tour included an unscheduled matinee, with proceeds going to the Salvation Army for victims of Hurricane Katrina.

Critical reception
The film received mixed reviews from critics. , the film holds a 59% approval rating on the review aggregator Rotten Tomatoes, based on 88 reviews with an average rating of 6.03/10, with the consensus that the film "has some entertaining moments, but is a mostly hit-and-miss documentary." Metacritic reported the film had an average score of 51 out of 100, based on 24 reviews.

Peter Hartlaub of the San Francisco Chronicle wrote "It's a funny comedy, and sometimes an even better drama" and called it a "nice companion piece" to the 2002 film Comedian. Hartlaub said "The comics all have their good and bad moments, but John Caparulo is arguably the most hilarious both on- and offstage" and "the movie is best when Vaughn plays off his own pop culture stature." Hartlaub also wrote that "director Ari Sandel paces the film well."

Stephen Holden of The New York Times described the film as "more of a backstage documentary" than a concert film. Holden wrote the film "includes some moderately funny snippets of actual performances" but "we never see a complete performance or even a quarter of one." Holden called it "among the tamest tours ever filmed." Holden wrote that the tour was re-routed because it came after Hurricane Katrina hit the Gulf Coast. Holden wrote "In the most revealing scene Mr. Vaughn and his crew visit an Alabama trailer camp to give free tickets to the residents, many of them New Orleans evacuees who lost everything."

Kyle Smith of the New York Post gave the film one star out of four, writing "A 2½-year-old collection of mediocre stand-up routines and dull backstage chatter, Vince Vaughn's Wild West Comedy Show demonstrates why comedy clubs require you to have a couple of drinks." Smith said "Only about 40 percent of the movie is even comedy; the rest consists of lots of shots of maps" and said the film was "worse than open-mike night."

Box office
The film opened in wide release in the United States on February 8, 2008, and grossed $464,170 in 962 theaters that weekend, averaging $483 per theater. The film grossed a total of $603,894 after three weeks in theaters. It has often been considered a box office bomb.

References

External links
 
 
 
 
 

2006 films
2006 comedy films
2006 directorial debut films
2006 documentary films
American documentary films
Documentary films about comedy and comedians
Documentary films about entertainers
Films directed by Ari Sandel
Picturehouse films
2000s English-language films
2000s American films